Dichlorobis(ethylenediamine)nickel(II) is the inorganic compound with the formula NiCl2(en)2, where en = ethylenediamine. The formula is deceptive: the compound is the chloride salt of the coordination complex [Ni2Cl2(en)4]2+. This blue solid is soluble in water and some polar organic solvents.  It is prepared by ligand redistribution from [Ni(en)3]Cl2 and hydrated nickel chloride:
 2 [Ni(en)3]Cl2  +  NiCl2   →   3 NiCl2(en)2

The rapid ligand redistribution is characteristic of the kinetic lability of octahedral nickel(II) complexes.  In contrast with the lability of [Ni(en)3]Cl2+ is the inertness of the isostructural tris(ethylenediamine)cobalt(III) cation.

References

Ethylenediamine complexes
Nickel complexes
Chloro complexes